Rudi Adams (November 10, 1919 – May 25, 2013) was a German politician of the Social Democratic Party (SPD) and former member of the German Bundestag.

Life 
Adams joined the SPD in 1948. Rudi Adams entered the Bundestag in 1966 via the state list of North Rhine-Westphalia and thereafter always as a directly elected member of parliament for the constituency of Cologne-Land. From 1970 to 1979 Adams was also a member of the European Parliament, of which he was vice-president from 1977 until his retirement.

Literature

References

1919 births
2013 deaths
Members of the Bundestag for North Rhine-Westphalia
Members of the Bundestag 1976–1980
Members of the Bundestag 1972–1976
Members of the Bundestag 1969–1972
Members of the Bundestag 1965–1969
Members of the Bundestag for the Social Democratic Party of Germany